H-bar or h-bar can refer to:

 H with stroke, a Latin letter H with a doubled horizontal stroke (Ħ ħ)
Voiceless pharyngeal fricative, represented in IPA by 
 Reduced Planck constant, in which the above symbol represents as a mathematical symbol, ħ = h/(2π) 
 Antihydrogen, an antimatter element represented by the symbol 
 Steyr AUG HBAR, a light machine gun version of the AUG assault rifle
 Multirests, indicated in musical notation through H-bars
 HBAR cryptocurrency, for Hedera Hashgraph's public distributed ledger

See also
Horizontal bar

Maltese alphabet